Robert Dickinson may refer to:

 Robert Dickinson (athlete) (1901–1981), British Olympic athlete
 Robert Dickinson (British Columbia politician) (1835–1889), Canadian politician
 Robert E. Dickinson (born 1940), American atmospheric scientist
 Robert Edmund Dickinson (1862–1947), British banker and Member of Parliament for Wells
 Robert Latou Dickinson (1861–1950), American physician, artist and scientist
 Rob Dickinson (born 1965), English rock guitarist and singer
 Robert Dickinson (lighting designer) (born 1954), television lighting designer

See also
 Robert Dickerson (1924–2015), painter